Adele Renault is a Belgian visual artist and muralist, known for her photo-realistic portraits of pigeons and people.

Background 
Adele Renault was born in Liège on 1988. She traveled to Venezuela and then to Brighton when she was 14 years old. In 2010, she graduated in graphic design  from the Académie Royale des Beaux-Arts in Brussels. She and Niels Shoe Meulman co-founded Unruly Gallery in 2011. Renault lived in Burkina Faso for a month in 2015 and visited many different villages. It resulted in 10 portraits painted in monochrome red, referring to the omnipresent red dust and the color of its earth in this landlocked nation in West Africa. In 2018, She moved to Los Angeles and published her debut book Feathers and Faces.

Selected exhibitions

Solo exhibitions 
 November 2020, Sway group show at Moberg Gallery, Des Moines, IA, USA.
 October 2020, Un détail devenu sujet solo show with PDP Gallery/Urban Art Fair, Paris, France.
 September 2018, Tyson's Corner solo show at Ring Side Lounge, Jersey City, NJ, United States.
 4 June 2016 - 30 July 2016, Les Hommes Intègres solo show at Galerie Droste, Germany.
 6 November 2015 - 3 December 2015, Campthepigeon solo show at Havas, Chicago, USA.
 September 2014 Adele Renault: Pigeon Voyageur solo show at Galerie Droste, Germany.
 March 2014 Les Clochards Célestes solo show at White Walls, San Francisco.

Group exhibitions 
 April 2021, Sensation Couleur collective exhibition at Galerie Quai4, Liège, Belgium.
 April 2021, Twisted Dreams group exhibition at John Wolf Art space, Los Angeles, USA.
 February 2019, Crossing Lines group show at PDP Gallery, Los Angeles, CA, United States.
 June 2019, In Bloom group show at Moberg Gallery, Des Moines, IA, USA.
 October 2019, Where art you? group show at PDP Gallery, Los Angeles, CA, USA.
 December 2019, 25: In Black&White group show curated by Juxtapoz, Miami, FL, USA.
 February 2018, Urban Legends group show at Antler Gallery, Portland, OR, USA.
 20 July 2017 - 17 August 2017, ONSET group show at First Amendment Gallery, San Francisco, USA.
 7 May 2016 - 25 July 2016, Group show at Tinney Contemporary, Nashville, USA.
 30 April 2016 - 19 June 2016, D'après Nature Group show at Musée des Beaux-Arts de Verviers, Belgium.
 13 & 14 May 2016, Group show at Saint Nicholas Cathedral, Newcastle, UK.
 5 February 2016, Group show at Gallery Vriend van Bavink, Amsterdam, Netherlands.
 12 November 2015, 3D trio show at Yoko Uhoda Gallery, Liège, Belgium.
 November 2013, Pigeon Portraits with Lisa Roze at Unruly Gallery, Amsterdam.
 April 2013, Repeat Club Group show at Witzenhausen Gallery, Amsterdam.
 September 2012, We the Artists Group Show at Unruly Gallery, Amsterdam.
 January 2009, TRUC TROC Group show at BOZAR, Brussels, Belgium.
 February 2007, Duo show with Alex Young, Soundstation, Liège, Belgium.

Gallery

References 

Women muralists
1988 births
Belgian muralists
Belgian women painters
Living people